, there were 1,932 electric vehicles registered in New Brunswick. , 2.3% of new cars sold in New Brunswick were electric.

Government policy
, the provincial government offers a tax rebate of up to $5,000 for electric vehicle purchases. , the provincial government offers a tax rebate of up to $750 for electric vehicle charger installation in homes.

Charging stations
, there were 102 public AC charging stations and 27 public DC charging stations in New Brunswick.

By region

Saint John
The first electric bus was added to the Saint John municipal fleet in June 2022.

References

New Brunswick
Transport in New Brunswick